Margo Oliver (1923 – 4 June 2010) was a Canadian cookery expert. She was the food editor of Weekend Magazine and wrote a number of cookbooks as well as articles on the subject of cooking.

Early life and education 

Oliver was born and grew up in Winnipeg, Manitoba. She worked wrapping parcels at Eaton's department store. She took a business course and for a short time worked as a legal secretary. In 1950, she earned an undergraduate degree in home economics from the University of Manitoba, followed by a year of graduate work at the University of Minnesota.

Career
Oliver worked for General Mills in the Betty Crocker Kitchens in Minneapolis. She became Canada's first "Betty Crocker" after General Mills expanded its operations into Canada. As "Betty Crocker", she spent four years traveling throughout Canada, appearing on radio and television, speaking to groups and giving cooking demonstrations.

She joined the staff of the (now defunct) Montreal Standard newspaper in 1959 as food editor of the weekend newspaper supplement, "Weekend Magazine", and its successor "Today", until 1982 when "Today" ceased publication. At her behest, the Standard built a proper test kitchen for her where she tested recipes for her columns in "Weekend Magazine" and "Today". During her time with Weekend Magazine, she married Victor Morgan.

Many of Oliver's recipes were reprinted and reviewed in newspapers and magazines. In 1993, she was inducted into the Hall of Fame of the Ontario Home Economists in Business (OHEIB).

Oliver died in June 2010 in Fergus, Ontario.

Writings on cooking 
Many obituaries published immediately after her death incorrectly stated that she wrote seven cookbooks, as does the article in the OHEIB Hall of Fame.

In English 

During her time at "Weekend Magazine" and "Today", Margo Oliver published approximately 10,000 recipes in the two, as well as five cookbooks plus several more ephemeral publications. (Many of the recipes originally published in "Weekend Magazine" and "Today" reappeared in these cookbooks.) Later, she published a further three cookbooks.

 Weekend Magazine Cookbook, Montreal Standard Publishing (Montreal), 1967; softcover reprint, Totem (Don Mills, Ontario), 1977, 
 Weekend Magazine Menu Cookbook, Montreal Standard Publishing (Montreal), 1972, ; softcover reprint, Optimum Publishing (Montreal), 1989, 
 Stew and Casserole Cookbook, Optimum Publishing (Montreal), 1975, 
 Most Treasured Recipes, Optimum Publishing (Montreal), 1977, 
 Great Entertainers, Health and Welfare Canada (Ottawa), 1980; reprinted, Alberta Alcohol and Drug Abuse Commission (Edmonton, Alberta), 1991,  and later on line.
 Weekend Magazine Cooking School, Weekend Magazine (Montreal?), 1981; Twenty Lessons About Basic Cooking and Baking Techniques plus Twenty-eight Additional Lessons About Basic Cooking and Baking Techniques
 Cooking for Today, Today Magazine Inc (Toronto), 1982, 
 Cookbook for Seniors, International Self-Counsel Press (North Vancouver, BC), 1989, 
 Good Food for One, International Self-Counsel Press (North Vancouver, BC), 1990, 
 Classical Canadian Recipes, Optimum Publishing (Montreal), 1993, ; this was also printed  Classical American Recipes, Great Pond Publishing (Stowe, Vermont), 1993,  and The Good Food Cookbook, Tormont Publishing (Montreal), 1993,  (a shortened version)

In French 

Several of Margo Oliver's cookbooks also appeared in French:

 Perspectives Les Menus, Montreal Standard Publishing (Montréal), 1972, 
 Cuisine Pour Tous Les Jours, Editions Optimum Limitée (Montréal), 1975, 

 La Bonne Cuisine, HB & Cie Editeurs (Montréal), 1992,

References

External links
Great Entertainers cookbook

1923 births
2010 deaths
University of Minnesota alumni
Writers from Winnipeg
Canadian food writers
Canadian women non-fiction writers
Women food writers
Women cookbook writers
Canadian expatriates in the United States